George I, Duke of Brieg (Brzeg) (1481 or 1483 – 30 May 1521), was a Duke of Legnica during 1488-1505 (with his brother as co-ruler) and of Brzeg (Brieg) since 1505 until his death.

He was the third and youngest son of Frederick I, Duke of Chojnów-Oława-Legnica-Brzeg-Lubin, by his wife Ludmila, daughter of George of Poděbrady, King of Bohemia.

Life
After the death of his father in 1488, George I and his two older brothers John II and Frederick II succeeded him in Legnica, Chojnów and Lubin; but because all were minors, the regency was held by their mother, the Dowager Duchess Ludmila, who received from her late husband Brzeg and Oława as dower until her death. John II died in 1495 still under the regency of Ludmila; George I and his brother Frederick II began their personal reign only three years later, in 1498.

Dowager Duchess Ludmila died in 1503 and their domains of Brzeg and Oława were inherited by his sons, who continued as co-rulers for another two years, until 1505, when they finally decided to make the division of their lands. George I received Brzeg and Lubin.

On 9 June 1516 George I married with Anna (b. 1492 – d. 25 April 1550), daughter of Bogislaw X, Duke of Pomerania. They had no children and for this, on his death George I was succeeded by his brother Frederick II only in Brzeg, because Lubin was granted to Dowager Duchess Anna as dower.

References

1481 births
1521 deaths
Dukes of Brzeg
Dukes of Legnica